Daniel Morgan (1736–1802) was a Continental Army general and U.S. Representative from Virginia.

Daniel Morgan (or Dan or Danny) may also refer to:

Sports
Danny Morgan (boxer) (born 1961), American middleweight boxer
Dan Morgan (offensive lineman) (born 1964), American football offensive lineman
Daniel Morgan (cricketer) (born 1974), Bermudian cricketer
Danny Morgan (Australian footballer) (born 1974), Australian rules footballer
Dan Morgan (born 1978), American football linebacker
Danny Morgan (footballer, born 1984), English footballer
Dan Morgan (footballer) (born 1990), New Zealand footballer

Others
Daniel Morgan (bushranger) (1830–1865), Australian bushranger
Daniel N. Morgan (1844–1931), American banker, Treasurer of the United States
Daniel E. Morgan (1877–1949), American politician, mayor of Cleveland, Ohio
Dan Morgan (writer) (1925–2011), English science fiction writer
Daniel John Morgan (1949–1987), English private investigator murdered in 1987
Danny Morgan (politician) (born 1972), American politician, Oklahoma state representative
Daniel Morgan (General Hospital), fictional character on the American soap opera General Hospital

See also
Dan Morgan (film), 1911 Australian film about the bushranger

Morgan, Daniel